Germany competed at the 2019 World Aquatics Championships in Gwangju, South Korea from 12 to 28 July.

Medalists

Artistic swimming

Germany's artistic swimming team consisted of 2 athletes (2 female).

Women

Diving

Germany entered 10 divers (six male and four female).

Men

Women

Mixed

High diving

Germany qualified one male and one female high diver, but opted not to enter the male diver.

Women

Open water swimming

Germany qualified five male and four female open water swimmers.

Men

Women

Team

Swimming

German swimmers have achieved qualifying standards in the following events (up to a maximum of 2 swimmers in each event at the A-standard entry time, and 1 at the B-standard)

Men

Women

Mixed

Water polo

Men's tournament

Team roster

Moritz Schenkel
Ben Reibel
Timo van der Bosch
Julian Real (C)
Tobias Preuss
Maurice Jüngling
Denis Strelezkij
Luuk Gielen
Marko Stamm
Mateo Čuk
Marin Restović
Dennis Eidner
Kevin Götz
Coach: Hagen Stamm

Group D

Playoffs

Quarterfinals

5th–8th place semifinal

Seventh place match

References

World Aquatics Championships
2019
Nations at the 2019 World Aquatics Championships